The 1971 Asian Cycling Championships took place at the Farrer Park Stadium in Singapore from 23 to 30 October 1971.

Medal summary

Road

Track

Medal table

References
 The Straits Times, 24 October 1971, Page 31
 The Straits Times, 25 October 1971, Page 27
 The Straits Times, 27 October 1971, Page 27
 The Straits Times, 28 October 1971, Page 22
 The Straits Times, 29 October 1971, Page 29
 The Straits Times, 30 October 1971, Page 29
 The Straits Times, 31 October 1971, Page 22

External links
 www.asiancycling.com

Asia
Asia
Asian Cycling Championships
1971 in Asian sport
International cycle races hosted by Singapore
1971 in Singaporean sport
October 1971 sports events in Asia